Frederick Lawrence Haddad (January 18, 1921 – January 13, 2003) was a prominent Arab-American businessman who was a co-founder and President of Heck's, a major discount retail chain in West Virginia and neighboring states.

Life
Haddad was born into a Syro-Lebanese Orthodox Christian family in 1921 in Clothier, West Virginia, the son of Nathan Makoul Haddad of Beirut (then Syria) and Sarah Emma David of South Dakota. His father Nathan immigrated to West Virginia in 1909 with his four brothers. The Haddad family owned a clothing store in Madison, West Virginia, for years. The Haddad family were among a number of Syrian and Lebanese immigrants to the United States in the late 1800s and early 1900s who began their careers as peddlers and merchants, working their way to the top by the second generation. According to Fred's father Nathan, "We planned it that way...Most of us came here with no education, no knowledge of the language, and no money. We didn't expect to reach the top ourselves, but we certainly meant to give our children every chance to do it."

Career
In 1959, Haddad co-founded Heck's along with Tommy Ellis, Lester Ellis, and Doug Cook. Heck's stands for Haddad, Ellis and Cook. Haddad served as President of Heck's from 1959 until his retirement in the 1980s. Heck's became a national pioneer in discount retailing before going bankrupt in the late 1980s. Haddad retired as chairman of the board of Heck's in 1983.

In the late 1980s, Haddad and a consortium of four other businessmen purchased the Silver Creek resort (now part of Snowshoe Mountain) and in turn sold it to two Charleston realtors.

Politics
Haddad was a member of the West Virginia Republican Party. In 1967, he ran unsuccessfully for Mayor of Charleston, West Virginia.

Legacy
During the early 1990s, the Haddad Riverfront Park in Charleston, West Virginia was constructed as a gift from Fred Haddad. The new park removed riverfront parking to make way for a stage and seating for live performances and other events. The park transformed the levee into a local attraction.

See also

Heck's

References

External links

Heck's, My West Virginia Home

1921 births
2003 deaths
American Methodists
American people of Lebanese descent
American people of Syrian descent
Businesspeople from Charleston, West Virginia
Greek Orthodox Christians from the United States
Members of the Greek Orthodox Church of Antioch
People from Madison, West Virginia
West Virginia Republicans